Caniaba is a village in New South Wales, Australia, on the outskirts of Lismore.

Towns in New South Wales